The 188th Ohio Infantry Regiment, sometimes 188th Ohio Volunteer Infantry (or 188th OVI) was an infantry regiment in the Union Army during the American Civil War.

Service
The 188th Ohio Infantry was organized at Camp Chase in Columbus, Ohio, and mustered in for one year service on March 4, 1865, under the command of Colonel Jacob E. Taylor.

The regiment left Ohio for Nashville, Tennessee, March 4. It was attached to 1st Brigade, Defenses Nashville & Chattanooga Railroad, Department of the Cumberland, to April 1865. 1st Brigade, 1st Sub-District, District of Middle Tennessee, to September 1865.  Performed provost duty at Murfreesboro, Tennessee, until May 1865. At Tullahoma, Tennessee, until July, and at Nashville, Tennessee, until September 1865.

The 188th Ohio Infantry mustered out of service September 21, 1865, at Nashville, Tennessee.

Casualties
The regiment lost a total of 45 enlisted men during service, all due to disease.

Commanders
 Colonel Jacob E. Taylor

Notable members
 Private Martin Welker, Company I – Lieutenant Governor of Ohio, 1858–1860; U.S. Representative from Ohio, 1865–1871; judge for the United States District Court for the Northern District of Ohio, 1873–1889
 Physician John Maynard Wheaton – pioneer ornithologist, among the founders of the American Ornithologists Union, namesake of The Wheaton Club, a group for naturalists founded in 1921

See also

 List of Ohio Civil War units
 Ohio in the Civil War

References
 Dyer, Frederick H. A Compendium of the War of the Rebellion (Des Moines, IA:  Dyer Pub. Co.), 1908.
 Ohio Roster Commission. Official Roster of the Soldiers of the State of Ohio in the War on the Rebellion, 1861–1865, Compiled Under the Direction of the Roster Commission (Akron, OH: Werner Co.), 1886–1895.
 Reid, Whitelaw. Ohio in the War: Her Statesmen, Her Generals, and Soldiers (Cincinnati, OH: Moore, Wilstach, & Baldwin), 1868. 
Attribution

External links
 Ohio in the Civil War: 188th Ohio Volunteer Infantry by Larry Stevens
 National flag of the 188th Ohio Infantry
 Regimental flag of the 188th Ohio Infantry
 Guidon of the 188th Ohio Infantry

Military units and formations established in 1865
Military units and formations disestablished in 1865
Units and formations of the Union Army from Ohio
1865 establishments in Ohio